The 2019 U Sports football season began on August 23, 2019, with the Concordia Stingers hosting the Montreal Carabins in Montreal, Quebec. The Atlantic University Sport conference started play the following day and the Ontario University Athletics conference began play on August 25, 2019. The Canada West teams began play during the following weekend, on August 30, 2019. All 27 U Sports football teams played eight regular season games against opponents within the same conference.

The conference championships were played on November 9 and the season ended on November 23 with the 55th Vanier Cup championship at PEPS Stadium in Quebec City, Quebec. The Calgary Dinos defeated the Montreal Carabins 27–13 to win their fifth Vanier Cup, and their first since 1995.

Regular season

Standings

Post-season awards

Award-winners

All-Canadian Team

Post-season 
The Vanier Cup is played between the champions of the Mitchell Bowl and the Uteck Bowl, the national semi-final games. In 2019, according to the rotating schedule, the Canada West Hardy Trophy championship team hosted the Yates Cup Ontario championship team for the Mitchell Bowl. The winners of the Atlantic conference's Loney Bowl hosted the Quebec conference Dunsmore Cup championship team for the Uteck Bowl.

Conference Playoffs

Atlantic University Sport

Réseau du sport étudiant du Québec

Ontario University Athletics

Canada West Universities Athletic Association

National Semifinals

National Championship

References

2019 in Canadian football
U Sports football seasons